Alma Smith may refer to:

 Alma Wheeler Smith (born 1941), U.S. politician
 Alma Genevieve Smith, married name of Alma Rubens (1897–1931), U.S. film actress